John W. French (November 9, 1809 – July 8, 1871) was an American Episcopal clergyman and educator.

Early years
John William French, D.D., was born November 9, 1809, son of Edmund French and Sarah Baldwin. His parents died when he was a child, and he was raised in Troy NY by his aunt, Sarah French Baldwin, and her husband William Baldwin.

Career
Dr. French graduated from Washington College (now Trinity College), Hartford CT, in 1832, and from General Theological Seminary, New York City, NY. He was a professor at Bristol College, Bucks County PA, Rector of an Episcopal Church in Portland ME, and then first rector of the Church of the Epiphany, Washington DC. He was appointed chaplain of the U.S. House of Representatives on May 31, 1841, and was the first Episcopalian to hold this position.

In 1856, Dr. French was named Chaplain of the U.S. Military Academy, West Point NY, and concurrently Professor of Geography, History, and Ethics there. He served in those positions until his death.

He was the author of "Short Course of Instruction in the Practical Part of Ethics", 1858; and "Grammar: Part of a Course on Language", 1865.

Family life
He married Clara Miller, and they had 6 children who survived childhood. Their son, John William French, Jr., was an officer in the U.S. Army, as were the husbands of 3 of their daughters. Their daughter Mary French married American Painter, Sculptor and Professor John Ferguson Weir. And their daughter Lillie Hamilton French was a prolific author and a long-time editor at Harper's Bazaar.

Death
Dr. French died July 8, 1871 at West Point, and is buried at the U.S. Military Academy cemetery.

Notes

1809 births
1871 deaths
American Episcopal clergy
American educators
Chaplains of the United States House of Representatives
American military chaplains
19th-century American Episcopalians
19th-century American clergy
United States Military Academy faculty
Burials at West Point Cemetery